Sibiti is a town located in the Lékoumou Region of the Republic of the Congo. It is also the region's capital and Sibiti District seat. The town is served by Sibiti Airport, located 300km west of Brazzaville, Republic Of The Congo.

Notable people
Theddy Ongoly, footballer

References

External links
 Association pour le Developpement de Sibiti (ADS)

Lékoumou Department
Populated places in the Republic of the Congo